The Nikon Z 6 is a full-frame mirrorless interchangeable-lens camera produced by Nikon. The camera was officially announced on August 23, 2018, to be released in November. Nikon began shipping the Z 6 to retailers on November 16, 2018. This was the second camera to use Nikon's new Z-mount system after the release of the 45.75 megapixel Nikon Z 7 in September 2018.

This more-affordable 24.5 mega-pixel full-frame model offers nearly all of the same specifications as the Z 7. Aside from the lower resolution, differences include fewer  phase-detection autofocus points (273 compared to 493) and an added anti-aliasing filter. The fewer mega-pixels allow for some benefits: a higher ISO equivalent, faster 12 fps (vs. 9 fps) drive speed, greater burst depth, and the ability to capture oversampled 4K video in full-frame up to 30 fps (and also in APS-C Crop, 10 MP APS-C still images can be captured) recording.

Three Z-mount lenses were available by December 2018, the Nikkor Z 24-70mm f/4 S
FX AF, the 35mm	f/1.8 S FX AF and the 50mm f/1.8 S FX AF. The F-to-Z mount adapter accessory allows for using Nikon lenses from the digital SLR series with full compatibility. In late 2018, Nikon also published a "roadmap" of lenses to be released between 2019 and 2021. A total of nine products were included in that list.

A DSLR version of this camera, the Nikon D780, providing similar auto focus performance and video performance, was released in January 2020.

Reception
The preliminary review by Imaging-Resource in the U.S. offered this summary of its conclusion after preliminary testing had been completed: "Overall, the Nikon Z6 is shaping up to be a very nice, all-around, enthusiast-grade mirrorless camera. ... I'm having a hard time finding any sizable criticism for the Z6. The image quality is fantastic, ... and the build quality is superb. The camera ... was easy to pick up and operate without much, if any, confusion. ... The camera feels great, works great and produces great photographs. I honestly can't ask for much more." The only negative comment at that time was that the Z 6 offers only a single XQD card slot; such cards were still quite expensive at the time and a single slot does not provide any "backup security".

Digital Photography Review rated the camera's sensor as providing excellent resolution and high ISO performance, "though on rare occasions you may see banding if shadow areas are brightened ... While fine detail isn't as well preserved at low ISO or at high ISO as the best of its peers, the Z6 generally strikes a nice balance between noise and detail. Low light Raw performance is competitive with the best of its peers, which is to say it's essentially class-leading." The editors suggested that the Z 6 may be preferable to the Z 7 for some photo enthusiasts. "While the Nikon Z7 may garner the most attention, the cheaper Z6 may actually prove the more impactful of the two cameras, since it'll be within reach of a larger number of photographers. And, since it captures oversampled video without a crop, it might be a more logical choice for video shooters than the higher-resolution Z7."

One other criticism about the Z 6 is its autofocus system being inferior to that of Canon and Sony's offerings, as well as its DSLR predecessors, such as the Nikon D750 and Nikon D780.

Update history

Nikon has released a number of firmware updates for the Z 6. The Z 6 and Z 7 have - so far - always received largely identical changes and share the same firmware version numbers. Some reviews of these cameras have been updated to reflect new autofocus features and improved autofocus performance over time.

Video capabilities

The Z 6 can internally record a range of 1080p and 4K video formats. External recorders can be connected via a HDMI type C connector. The Z6 always provides a "clean-feed" output without any on-screen displays in video mode.

See also

 Nikon Z-mount
 Nikon Z 5
 Nikon Z 7
 Nikon Z 6II
 Nikon Z 7II
 Nikon Z 50
 Nikon D780

Photo gallery

References

External links

Z 6
Z 6
Cameras introduced in 2018
Full-frame mirrorless interchangeable lens cameras